Yousef Behzadi (born June 29, 1990) is an Iranian footballer who plays as a goalkeeper for Zob Ahan in the Persian Gulf Pro League.

Honours

Club
Naft MIS
Azadegan League: 2017–18

References

Living people
1990 births
Association football goalkeepers
Iranian footballers
Shahr Khodro F.C. players
Sportspeople from Tehran